Marco Polo is an American drama streaming television series inspired by Marco Polo's early years in the court of Kublai Khan, the Khagan of the Mongol Empire and the founder of the Yuan dynasty (1271–1368). The show premiered on Netflix on December 12, 2014. The series was created by John Fusco and stars Lorenzo Richelmy in the title role, with Benedict Wong as Kublai Khan. It was produced by The Weinstein Company. On January 7, 2015, Marco Polo was renewed by Netflix for a 10-episode second season, which premiered on July 1, 2016.

On December 12, 2016, Netflix announced that they had canceled Marco Polo after two seasons. Sources told The Hollywood Reporter that the two seasons resulted in a $200 million loss for Netflix, and the decision to cancel was jointly taken by Netflix and The Weinstein Company.

Cast and characters

Main
 Lorenzo Richelmy as Marco Polo, the son of a Venetian merchant who travels to China and is ultimately left there as a guest of Kublai Khan, rising to official position in the court.
 Benedict Wong as Kublai Khan, the fifth Great Khan of the Mongol Empire. Wong also stars in the Christmas special "One Hundred Eyes".
 Joan Chen as Empress Chabi, the Khan's favorite and most important wife who is a valued unofficial adviser.
 Rick Yune as Kaidu, the Khan's cousin and rival, leader of the House of Ögedei
 Amr Waked as Yusuf (season 1), the Khan's Vice Regent
 Remy Hii as Prince Jingim, the Khan's lawful son and heir.
 Zhu Zhu as Nergui  Princess Kokachin, a servant of Princess Kokachin, the Blue Princess of the Bayaut tribe, who disguises herself as the Princess. 
 Tom Wu as Hundred Eyes, a blind Taoist monk willfully enslaved to the Khan and sifu to Jingim and Marco Polo. Wu also stars in the Christmas special "One Hundred Eyes".
 Mahesh Jadu as Ahmad, a Persian Muslim from Bukhara who is the Khan's Minister of Finance and adopted son. 
 Olivia Cheng as Jia Mei Lin, concubine of the late Emperor Lizong of Song and sister to chancellor Jia Sidao
 Uli Latukefu as Byamba, the Khan's bastard son, a general of both the imperial army and the Mongol horde
 Chin Han as Jia Sidao, the chancellor to the Song Emperors Huaizong and Duanzong, and Mei Lin's brother
 Pierfrancesco Favino as Niccolò Polo, a Venetian merchant and Marco's father
 Ron Yuan as Prince Nayan (season 2), Kublai's uncle and a Nestorian Christian
 Claudia Kim as Khutulun (season 2; recurring, season 1), Kaidu's daughter and favored child, niece of the Khan, and a superb warrior
 Jacqueline Chan as Shabkana (season 2), Kaidu's mother
 Leonard Wu as Orus (season 2), Kaidu's son
 Thomas Chaanhing as Gerel (season 2), a khan loyal to Kaidu
 Chris Pang as Arban (season 2), a khan loyal to Kaidu
 Gabriel Byrne as Pope Gregory X (season 2)
 Michelle Yeoh as Lotus (season 2), a Taoist nun and the designated protector of the Song Dynasty's boy emperor. Yeoh also stars in the Christmas special "One Hundred Eyes".

Recurring
 Corrado Invernizzi as Maffeo Polo (season 1), Marco's uncle
 Tan Kheng Hua as Xie Daoqing (season 1), empress dowager of the Song Dynasty
 Lawrence Makoare as Za Bing (season 1), Princess Kokachin's eunuch protector
 Vanessa Vanderstraaten as Princess Sorga (season 1), one of Jingim's wives
 Patrick Teoh as General Red Brow (season 1)
 Shu An Oon as Jing Fei (season 1), Mei Lin's friend, also an imperial concubine
 Chloe Luthi (season 1) and Jaime Chew (season 2) as Ling Ling, the daughter of Mei Lin and the former Emperor of the Song Dynasty
 Nicholas Bloodworth as Tulga (season 1), Kokachin's guardian
 Max Kellady as Emperor Duzong, the son of the empress dowager and the former Emperor of the Song Dynasty
 Soffi Jikan as Milo Boy (season 1)
 Mano Maniam as The Old Man / Hassan-i Sabbah (season 1)
 Daniel Tuiara as Sukh (season 2), Ahmad's sworn Burmese warrior
 Tosh Zhang as Bai (season 2)
 Byambadorj Altanhuyag as General Qaban (season 2)
 Esther Low as Kokachin (season 2; guest, season 1), the real Blue Princess of the Mongol Bayaut tribe
 Jason Chong as General Kasar (season 2)

Notable guest stars
 Baljinnyamyn Amarsaikhan as Ariq Böke (season 1), the Khan's brother, overseer of Karakorum
 Togo Igawa as Chuluun (season 2)

Production
The series was originally developed at Starz, which had picked up the series in January 2012. After attempts to film in China failed, the project was released back to The Weinstein Company. Netflix then picked up the series for a 10-episode season, for approximately $90 million, making it one of the most expensive TV shows in the world, second to Game of Thrones. The project was officially announced at Netflix in January 2014. Joachim Rønning and Espen Sandberg serve as executive producers and directed the pilot and second episodes, "The Wayfarer" and "The Wolf and the Deer", respectively. The series was filmed in Kazakhstan, Italy, and at Pinewood Studios in Malaysia, as well as at outdoor locations in Malaysia, particularly tropical wilderness, as well as Slovakia and Hungary. Kazakhstan doubled as the steppes of Mongolia, Malaysia was the base of operations as well as serving as a location, Hungary provided a setting for Renaissance Rome, and Slovakia provided some mountain settings for Season 2.

Stuntman Ju Kun was working on the show alongside fight choreographer Brett Chan, but went missing with the disappearance of Malaysia Airlines Flight MH370 during pre-production.

To prepare for her role as Chabi, Joan Chen read the book The Secret History of the Mongol Queens by Jack Weatherford, as she wanted her performance to reflect the culture of the time period.

During his extensive research, show creator John Fusco traveled the Silk Road by horseback and also crossed the Ming Sha Dunes of Western China on camel. In Venice he sought out and studied the last will and testament of Marco Polo. While some Mongolian viewers and experts view it as "riddled with historical errors", many have praised the series. Orgil Makhaan, who played Genghis Khan in a BBC documentary, said it was more accurate than any previous foreign portrayal of Mongolian culture. "As a Mongol and an artist, Marco Polo makes me feel like our dreams are coming true," he told AFP. "I watched all 10 episodes in just one day."

Music
The series featured music by Mongolian bands Altan Urag and Batzorig Vaanchig of Asia's Got Talent, who cameoed as a singer. Daniele Luppi composed the main theme, whilst Peter Nashel and Eric V. Hachikian are the composers of the original score.

Episodes

Season 1 (2014)

Christmas special (2015)

Season 2 (2016)

Reception

The first season of Marco Polo was met with negative reviews from critics. On Rotten Tomatoes, the first season has a rating of 33%, based on 45 reviews, with an average rating of 4.79/10. The site's critical consensus reads, "An all-around disappointment, Marco Polo is less entertaining than a round of the game that shares its name." On Metacritic, the show's first season has a score of 48 out of 100 based on reviews from 22 critics, indicating "mixed or average reviews".

In his review for Entertainment Weekly, Jeff Jensen gave the first season a "B−" rating, calling the premise "stale", but added "Somewhere in the middle of episode 2, though, Marco Polo becomes surprisingly watchable. The filmmaking becomes bolder." Writing for People, Tom Gliatto praised the series, calling it "... a fun, body-flinging, old-fashioned epic". USA Today reviewer Robert Bianco gave the series 1 stars out of 4, saying, "Clearly what Netflix hopes you'll see a [sic] big-bucks, prestige entertainment along the lines of that HBO fantasy epic, but in truth, Marco is far closer to one of those cheesy international syndicated adventures."

The second season was met with more positive reviews. On Rotten Tomatoes, it holds a rating of 100%, based on 6 reviews, with a rating average of 7.2/10.

In 2015, the President of Mongolia, Tsakhiagiin Elbegdorj, presented John Fusco and the Marco Polo creative team with an award, honoring their positive portrayal and global presentation of Mongolian subject matter. Fusco himself has described the series as historical fiction based on the accounts of the Italian traveler Marco Polo.

Accolades

See also
 Europeans in Medieval China
 Mongol conquest of the Song dynasty
 History of the Song dynasty

Notes

References

External links
 Marco Polo on Netflix
 

English-language Netflix original programming
Cultural depictions of Marco Polo
Cultural depictions of Kublai Khan
Television series set in the Yuan dynasty
2010s American drama television series
2014 American television series debuts
2016 American television series endings
Television series set in the Mongol Empire
Television series set in the 13th century
Television series by The Weinstein Company